Caravana Sereia Bloom is the third studio album by Brazilian singer-songwriter Céu.  It was released in 2012 Worldwide.

Track listing

Personnel
Credits for Caravana Sereia Bloom adapted from liner notes.
Musicians
 Céu - vocals (all tracks), organ (tracks 4 and 11), electronic drums (track 4), programming (track 9), guitar (track 11), bass guitar (track 11)
 Gui Amabis - programming (tracks 1, 2, 3, 5, 6, 7, 8, 10, and 12), guitar (tracks 4, 5, and 10), keyboards (tracks 3, 8, and 10), bass guitar (tracks 2 and 5), vibraphone (track 1)
 Dustan Gallas	- guitar (tracks 2, 4, 6, 8, and 12), keyboards (tracks 2, 3, 6, and 12), piano (track 8), vibraphone (track 2), wurlitzer (track 1)
 Negresko Sis - backing vocals (tracks 3 and 8)
 Edgard Poças - acoustic guitar (track 7)
 Pupillo - drums (tracks 1, 2, 3, 6, and 13)
 Bruno Buarque - drums (tracks 4 and 8)
 Fernando Catatau - guitar (track 1)
 Curumin - drums (tracks 10 and 12)
 Dengue - bass guitar (tracks 3 and 6)
 Thiago Franca - tenor saxophone (tracks 6 and 10)
 Nahor Gomes	- flugelhorn (tracks 8 and 10), trumpet (track 8)
 Lúcio Maia - guitar (track 13) 
 Lucas Martins	- bass guitar (tracks 1, 4, 8, 10, 12, and 13)

Production
 Gui Amabis - composer, engineering, production, lyrics
 Oswaldo Martins - composer, lyrics
 Llyod Robinson - composer, lyrics
 Lucas Santtana - composer, lyrics
 Simon Simantob - production coordination
 Felipe Tichauer - mastering
 Yuri Kalil - engineering
 Breno Kruse - production coordination
 Gustavo Lenza - engineering, mixing
 Rica Amabis	production, programming
 André Bourgeois - executive producer
 Glenmore Brown - composer, lyrics
 Nelson Cavaquinho - composer, lyrics
 Jorge du Peixe - composer

References

2012 albums
Céu albums
Portuguese-language albums
Tropicália albums